The Perry C. and Mattie Forrest Holdoegel House is a historic dwelling located in Rockwell City, Iowa, United States.  Perry C. Holdoegel was a member of the Iowa Senate who was responsible for the legislation that established the state park system in Iowa.  It was the first conservation law in Iowa of any significance.  He was also responsible for the establishment of Twin Lakes State Park in Calhoun County.  The house was built in 1917, the same year Holdoegel entered the state senate.  It was designed in the Colonial Revival style by the Fort Dodge architectural firm of Damon and O'Meara.  They were also responsible for a similar house in town.  The house features a two-story entrance porch that is supported in each corner by three columns of the Doric order, and topped with a balustraded balcony.  There is an arched entryway with a fanlight and sidelights.  The windows have flat keystone lintels, and functional wood shutters.  At the top of the structure is a shallow, molded and unadorned cornice.  On top of the roof are narrow gable dormers with arched windows and triangular pediments.  The house was listed on the National Register of Historic Places in 1992.

References

Houses completed in 1917
Houses on the National Register of Historic Places in Iowa
National Register of Historic Places in Calhoun County, Iowa
Houses in Calhoun County, Iowa
Colonial Revival architecture in Iowa